Jaroslav Kůs (born March 3, 1990) is a Czech professional ice hockey player. He currently plays with Piráti Chomutov in the Czech Extraliga.

Kůs made his Czech Extraliga debut playing with Piráti Chomutov debut during the 2012–13 Czech Extraliga season.

References

External links

1990 births
Living people
Czech ice hockey centres
Piráti Chomutov players
Sportovní Klub Kadaň players
HC Litvínov players
HC Karlovy Vary players